The players draft for the 2019 Pakistan Super League was held on 20 November 2018 at Islamabad. More than 630 players ware included in the draft, from which each franchise finalised a squad of 16 players along with 4 supplementary players. The tournament was the fourth season of Pakistan Super League, and took place between 14 February and 17 March 2019.

Background
On 29 September 2018, the trade and retention window started. 89 players from Pakistan were announced in five renewed categories; 14 in platinum, 9 in diamond, 20 in gold, 34 in silver and 12 in emerging. 14 overseas players in Platinum category were announced on 4 October. The business window closed on 13 November.

It was reported that Ahmed Shehzad will remain a part of the draft, despite his four-month-ban on international game. It was also reported on 31 October that Misbah-ul-Haq decided not to play in fourth onward seasons of PSL, though he will continue to be part of the team United. However, on 19 November, he decided to play in the season and parted ways with United. Brendon McCullum also announced on 3 November that he will not play for Qalandars, and Mohammad Hafeez announced on 8 November his leave from Zalmi. Shahid Afridi also left the team Kings as they decided not to retain him.

Transfers
On 16 October 2018, it was announced that Sohail Tanvir was transferred from Sultans to Gladiators for a Diamond pick. On 3 November, it was announced that Sunil Narine and Umar Akmal were transferred from Qalandars to Gladiators, in change of Hasan Khan, Rahat Ali and a platinum pick.

Retained players
On 13 November 2018, PSL announced the retention players list with all six teams retaining a total of 51 players from previous season.

Draft picks
Following is the list of players picked in the draft by the respective team:

New players
Platinum
  AB de Villiers
  Steve Smith
  Corey Anderson
  Dan Christian
Diamond
  Craig Overton
  Ben Cutting
  Mujeeb Ur Rahman
  Solomon Mire
  Paul Stirling
  Kemar Roach
  Shimron Hetmyer
  Mark Wood

Replacements
The replacement draft was held at Gaddafi Stadium on 24 January 2019. The teams were allowed to pick 21st member in the squad, and to replace the unavailable players with the available ones. Qalandars picked Saad Ali as 21st player and named Hardus Viljoen and David Wiese to play in partial absence of AB de Villiers, Carlos Brathwaite and Corey Anderson. Sultans expanded the squad with Hammad Azam, and picked Andre Russell and James Vince in place of injured Steve Smith and Joe Denly respectively. Gladiators' expansion pick was Mohammad Irfan, while Dwayne Smith will be playing during the absence of Dwayne Bravo. Kings picked Umer Khan as 21st player, and Zalmi replaced Waqar Salamkheil with Andre Fletcher. Meanwhile, Zalmi and United didn't submit their squad expansion pick.

Few days before the tournament, Johnson Charles replaced Nicholas Pooran in Sultans squad, who became unavailable after being selected for the ODI series against England, and Mohammad Hasnain replaced Naseem Shah in Gladiators squad, after the latter suffered an injury. On 10 February, it was reported that Chris Green will be playing as a replacement for both Dan Christian and James Vince only for first week of the season, and when Andre Russell would leave after both players arrive, he will become replacement player for Russell in the squad. A day before the tournament, Zalmi picked Pakistani opener Imam-ul-Haq as their 21st player. Qalandars Captain Mohammad Hafeez suffered a thumb injury while bowling against Karachi Kings which resulted in him being ruled out of the season, he was replaced by Salman Butt. Lendl Simmons and Tymal Mills replaced Dawid Malan and Chris Jordan, respectively in Peshawar Zalmi squad, after both were selected in England's squad for the T20I series against West Indies. Riki Wessels replaced Ryan ten Doeschate in Qalandars' squad after the latter injured himself while bowling in a match against Peshawar Zalmi, while Asela Gunaratne replaced Corey Anderson as he was unavailable for Pakistan leg.

References

External links
 

Pakistan Super League player drafts
2019 Pakistan Super League